The 2014 GP2 Series season , was the forty-eighth season of the second-tier of Formula One feeder championship and also tenth season under the GP2 Series moniker, a support series to the 2014 Formula One World Championship. Russian Time were the defending team champions.

In his fourth season in the series, DAMS driver Jolyon Palmer won the championship title after a consistent season, with points-scoring finishes in 20 of the campaign's 22 races. He won four races – joint-most for the season, along with Stoffel Vandoorne and Felipe Nasr – and achieved twelve podium finishes, en route to the title, which he won in Russia. The battle for the runner-up position in the championship standings was not decided until the final race of the season, between Vandoorne and Nasr. It was ultimately settled in favour of Vandoorne, by five points, after a fifth-place finish compared to Nasr's second-place finish. Vandoorne, a rookie in the series after moving from Formula Renault 3.5, had started the season with a victory in his first start in Bahrain, and also won at the Hungaroring, Monza, and Abu Dhabi. After two winless years in the series, Nasr took his first GP2 victory in his 50th start, in Montmeló. He also achieved wins at the Red Bull Ring, Silverstone, and Spa-Francorchamps, before his graduation to Formula One for the  season.

A trio of double race-winners filled positions four, five and six in the final drivers' championship standings. Mitch Evans – driving for defending teams' champions RT Russian Time – was another first-time winner in the series, taking back-to-back feature race victories at Silverstone and Hockenheim, the latter from 15th on the grid. Fifth place went to Johnny Cecotto Jr. for the Trident team, recording his best season in the series, which included victories in Montmeló and Spielberg. Racing Engineering driver Stefano Coletti completed the championship top six, with sprint race victories at Hockenheim and Abu Dhabi. Four other drivers won on one occasion, and for each, was their first GP2 victory. Stéphane Richelmi won the sprint race, for DAMS, on home soil in Monaco, matching Coletti's feat from the previous season. Rookies Arthur Pic (Campos Racing) and Raffaele Marciello (Racing Engineering) won the feature races at the Hungaroring and Spa-Francorchamps respectively, while Marco Sørensen achieved the first victory for MP Motorsport, with sprint race success in Sochi.

DAMS were the winners of the teams' championship for the second time in three seasons – after a similar title sweep with Davide Valsecchi winning the drivers' championship in 2012 – finishing 57 points clear of closest competitors, Carlin. ART Grand Prix finished a further 37 points in arrears, completing the championship top trio.

Regulation changes
The 2013 season was originally proposed to be the last season with the third-generation GP2 chassis, the Dallara GP2/11, which was introduced in 2011, but it was decided that the series would continue to use this chassis for a further three years in order to avoid a leap in costs to the competitors. The series continued to use tyres provided by Pirelli.

Free practice sessions were extended from 30 to 45 minutes long. Drivers were required to use both the harder "Prime" and softer "Option" tyre compounds during a Feature Race – unless declared a wet race – mirroring the rules of Formula One. Previously, drivers had been free to use both compounds as they saw fit, provided both were used over the course of a race meeting.

Teams and drivers

Team changes
 Addax Team left the championship as team principal Alejandro Agag concentrated his efforts on organising the inaugural FIA Formula E Championship. Their place was taken by Adrian Campos' eponymous team, Campos Racing, who returned to the championship after Campos originally sold the team to Agag in 2009 as he prepared his ill-fated attempt to join the Formula One grid.
 Hilmer Motorsport formed a partnership with Formula One team Force India to become Force India's junior team.
 Russian Time parted ways with Motopark Academy – who ran the team's cars in 2013 – following the death of team founder Igor Mazepa, and recruited members of iSport International to run the team.

Driver changes

Entering GP2
 Super Formula driver Takuya Izawa made his GP2 Series debut with ART Grand Prix.
 Indy Lights driver Axcil Jefferies moved to the GP2 Series with Trident.
 Raffaele Marciello, the 2013 European Formula Three champion, entered the series with Racing Engineering.
 2013 German Formula Three runner-up Artem Markelov joined GP2 with Russian Time.
 André Negrão entered GP2, racing for Arden International.
 Arthur Pic joined the series with Campos Racing.
 Facu Regalia, GP3 Series runner-up, graduated to the series with Hilmer Motorsport.
 2013 Auto GP runner-up Kimiya Sato raced with the returning Campos Racing team.
 2013 Formula Renault 3.5 Series runner-up Stoffel Vandoorne was placed at ART Grand Prix by Formula One team McLaren.

Changing teams
 Daniel Abt left ART Grand Prix to join Hilmer Motorsport.
 Nathanaël Berthon, who raced for Trident Racing moved to Venezuela GP Lazarus.
 René Binder switched from Venezuela GP Lazarus to Arden International.
 Johnny Cecotto Jr. left Arden International and returned to Trident Racing, the team he competed for in 2010.
 Stefano Coletti, who raced for Rapax moved to Racing Engineering.
 Conor Daly, who drove in the 2013 season opener for Hilmer Motorsport, switched to Venezuela GP Lazarus.
 Mitch Evans switched from Arden International to Russian Time.
 Rio Haryanto moved from the departing Addax Team to join Caterham Racing, replacing Sergio Canamasas.
 Jon Lancaster switched from Hilmer Motorsport to MP Motorsport.
 Julián Leal moved from Racing Engineering to Carlin.
 Jolyon Palmer left Carlin to join DAMS.
 After having driven for MP Motorsport and Hilmer Motorsport in 2013, Adrian Quaife-Hobbs switched to Rapax in 2014.

Leaving GP2
 Sam Bird left Russian Time and the GP2 Series to join the Starworks Motorsport team for the 2014 United SportsCar Championship season.
 James Calado left ART Grand Prix and the GP2 Series to join the FIA World Endurance Championship with AF Corse.
 Marcus Ericsson left DAMS and the series to join the Caterham F1 team.
 Robin Frijns left the series to concentrate on his reserve driver commitments to the Caterham F1 team.
 Fabio Leimer, who won the 2013 championship with Racing Engineering, left the series, as the reigning champion was not permitted to continue racing in the category. He joined the FIA World Endurance Championship with Rebellion Racing.

Mid-season changes
 Sergio Canamasas made his comeback to the series, replacing Axcil Jefferies at the Trident team for his home event in Barcelona.
 Tom Dillmann, who raced with Russian Time in 2013, returned to the series in Montmeló, replacing Arden's André Negrão, who had suffered a back injury.
 GP3 Series graduate Tio Ellinas, replaced Jon Lancaster at MP Motorsport, after the first round. He was replaced by Formula Renault 3.5 Series driver Marco Sørensen at the Silverstone round. Ellinas returned in Sochi to replace Adrian Quaife-Hobbs, after an injured neck ruled him out on medical advice. Kevin Giovesi, who competed in the previous season, replaced Ellinas for the final round, in Abu Dhabi.
 Jon Lancaster replaced Facu Regalia at Hilmer Motorsport at the Silverstone round.
 Alexander Rossi left the Caterham F1 and EQ8 Caterham Racing teams before the Hockenheimring round. He later joined Campos Racing as a substitute for Kimiya Sato, who raced in Auto GP that weekend, while his place at Caterham was taken by Tom Dillmann. Dillmann missed the Monza round of the championship, due to a conflicting round of the Porsche Carrera Cup France at Magny-Cours; his place was taken by Formula Renault 3.5 Series driver Pierre Gasly.
 Sergio Campana took over Conor Daly's seat at Venezuela GP Lazarus for the Monza and Sochi rounds. Daly returned for the final race in Abu Dhabi.
 Daniel Abt missed the series finale at Abu Dhabi due to his Formula E commitments; his seat at Hilmer Motorsport went to FIA European F3 Championship driver Nicholas Latifi.

Calendar
After the final race of the 2013 season, series organisers announced that the 2014 championship would be contested at every European round of the Formula One World Championship. With the expansion of the Formula One calendar to include races in Russia and Austria, the GP2 Series held rounds at the Sochi Autodrom and the Red Bull Ring for the first time. The final calendar, consisting of eleven rounds, was revealed on 6 December 2013.

Calendar changes
The rounds in Sepang, Malaysia and Marina Bay, Singapore – on the GP2 series calendar in both 2012 and 2013 – were omitted for 2014.
The GP2 series visited two venues – the Red Bull Ring in Austria and the Sochi Autodrom in Russia – for the first time during the 2014 season.

Results

Summary

Championship standings
Scoring system
Points were awarded to the top 10 classified finishers in the Feature race, and to the top 8 classified finishers in the Sprint race. The pole-sitter in the feature race also received four points, and two points were given to the driver who set the fastest lap inside the top ten in both the feature and sprint races. No extra points were awarded to the pole-sitter in the sprint race.

Feature race points

Sprint race points
Points were awarded to the top 8 classified finishers.

Drivers' championship

Notes:
† — Drivers did not finish the race, but were classified as they completed over 90% of the race distance.

Teams' championship

Notes:
† — Drivers did not finish the race, but were classified as they completed over 90% of the race distance.

Notes

References

External links
 

GP2 Series
GP2 Series seasons
GP2 Series